is the former manager for the Hanshin Tigers baseball team in Japan's Nippon Professional Baseball. After serving 3 seasons (2009–2011) with the team, he was released in October after failing to make the 2011 play-offs. He was shortly replaced with by Yutaka Wada, who had also previously played for the team during his baseball career.

External links
 Hanshin Tigers manager Akinobu Mayumi official Site 
 Office Mayumi 

1953 births
Crown Lighter Lions players
Hanshin Tigers managers
Hanshin Tigers players
Japanese expatriate baseball players in the United States
Living people
Managers of baseball teams in Japan
People from Ōmuta, Fukuoka
Baseball people from Fukuoka Prefecture
Taiheiyo Club Lions players